Kurt Wallace (born July 17, 1957) is an American Republican politician. He is a member of the Alabama House of Representatives, being first elected in 2010.

He also was Mayor of Maplesville from 2008 to 2010.

References

1957 births
Living people
Republican Party members of the Alabama House of Representatives
Mayors of places in Alabama
People from Chilton County, Alabama